Eschaton is the third studio album by British extreme metal band Anaal Nathrakh. Musically, the album continues in the vein of the previous album, Domine Non Es Dignus. Some reviewers have commented that the overall atmosphere and production are at the same time a step back towards the out-and-out ferocity of the band's debut. The album features guest appearances by Shane Embury (Embryonymous) on bass, and Attila Csihar (from Mayhem) performs vocals on "Regression to the Mean".

Background
The album cover art resembles parts of the Mandelbrot set. "The Necrogeddon" is a re-recording from Total Fucking Necro. The album features sound samples from the television series Blackadder II ("The Destroying Angel"), and the films Saw ("The Yellow King") and Zulu ("The Necrogeddon"). Lyrics for the song "When Lion Devours Both Dragon and Child" include an adaptation of text from the Book of Job, chapter 10, and the clean sung parts describe and quote "The Madman's Parable" by Friedrich Nietzsche. The song "The Yellow King" is based on the horror story The King in Yellow by Robert W. Chambers.

Track listing

Personnel

Anaal Nathrakh
V.I.T.R.I.O.L. – vocals
Irrumator – all instruments

Additional musicians
Attila Csihar – vocals ("Regression to the Mean")
Ventnor – guitar
Drunk – samples
Shane Embury – bass

Production
Mick Kenney – production, recording, engineering, mixing, mastering
Dave Hunt – mastering

2006 albums
Anaal Nathrakh albums
Season of Mist albums